Mackenzie, MacKenzie and McKenzie are alternative spellings of a Scottish surname relating to Clan Mackenzie. It was originally written MacKenȝie and pronounced  in Scots, with the "z" representing the old Middle Scots letter, "ȝ" yogh. This is an anglicised form of the Scottish Gaelic MacCoinnich, which is a patronymic form of the personal name Coinneach, anglicized as Kenneth. The personal name means "handsome".

People with the surname

Mackenzie, MacKenzie

A–I
Adam MacKenzie, (born 1984), Scottish field hockey defender
Aggie MacKenzie (born 1955), Scottish television presenter
Alastair Mackenzie (born 1970), Scottish actor
Alexander Mackenzie (explorer) (1764–1820), explorer and employee Hudson's Bay Company
Alexander Mackenzie (politician) (1822–1892), building contractor and writer, second prime minister of Canada
Alexander Mackenzie of Kintail (died 1488), chief of the Clan Mackenzie
Alexander Mackenzie (composer) (1847–1935), British musician, composer
Alexander Slidell Mackenzie (1803–1848), U.S. Navy officer
Alexander Johnston Mackenzie (1912–1945), Scottish barrister, soldier, and author 
Alister MacKenzie (1870–1934), British golf course designer
Anna Maria Mackenzie (fl. 1783–1811), British novelist
Anne MacKenzie (disambiguation), several people
Arthur John Mackenzie (1871–1949), Scottish chess master
Billy Mackenzie (1957–1997), Scottish singer, member of the rock band The Associates
Bruce Roy MacKenzie (died 1978), British intelligence operative and Minister of Agriculture in Kenya
Cameron Mackenzie (disambiguation), several people
Catriona McKenzie, Australian filmmaker
Colin Mackenzie, 1st Earl of Seaforth, (died 1633), chief of the Clan Mackenzie
Colin Mackenzie (1754–1821), Surveyor General of India, art collector and orientalist
Colin Mackenzie (1877–1938), Australian anatomist, benefactor and museum administrator
Colin Mackenzie (British Army officer) (1861–1956), Canadian Chief of the General Staff
Colin Cam Mackenzie of Kintail (died 1594), chief of the Clan Mackenzie
Colin Hercules Mackenzie (1898–1986), Head of S.O.E. in the Far East
Compton Mackenzie (1883–1972), Scottish novelist
Dan Mackenzie, American songwriter-producer
Dan MacKenzie, Canadian sports and marketing executive
Dave MacKenzie (politician) (born 1947), Canadian politician
D. J. M. Mackenzie (1905–1994), British colonial medical official
Donald Alexander Mackenzie (1873–1936), Scottish journalist and folklorist
Donald Angus MacKenzie, professor of sociology at the University of Edinburgh, Scotland
Donald MacKenzie (rower), Canadian rower who won a medal at the 1904 Summer Olympics
Duncan Mackenzie, British archaeologist
Elizabeth MacKenzie (disambiguation), several people
Eric Francis MacKenzie, American Roman Catholic bishop
Francis MacKenzie (born 1960), leader of Nova Scotia Liberal Party
George Mackenzie (disambiguation), several people
George Mackenzie of Rosehaugh (1636‑1691), Scottish lawyer and legal writer
George Mackenzie, 2nd Earl of Seaforth (died 1651), chief of the Clan Mackenzie
George Henry Mackenzie (1837–1891), Scottish-born American chess champion
Gisele MacKenzie (1927–2003), Canadian singer
Hector Roy Mackenzie (died 1528), landowner in Gairloch
Henry Mackenzie (1745–1831), Scottish novelist
Ian Alistair Mackenzie (1890–1949), Canadian parliamentarian
Ian Mackenzie-Kerr (1929–2005), British book designer

J–Z
Jack Mackenzie (1888–1984), Canadian engineer and academic
James Cameron Mackenzie (born 1852), American educator
James MacKenzie (VC) (1889–1914), Scottish soldier, recipient of the Victoria Cross
James Mackenzie (actor) (born 1979), Scottish actor
Jane Mackenzie (1825–1893), second wife of Alexander Mackenzie
Janet Mackenzie (born 1962), British Anglican priest
Jean Kenyon Mackenzie (1874–1936), American writer and missionary in West Africa
John Mackenzie (disambiguation), several people
John Mackenzie (VC) (1869–1915), Scottish, recipient of the Victoria Cross
John MacKenzie (Medal of Honor) (1886–1933), American Medal of Honor recipient
John Joseph Mackenzie (born 1865), Canadian pathologist
John Stuart Mackenzie (born 1860), British philosopher
Jock Mackenzie, Scottish footballer
Kelvin MacKenzie (born 1946), editor/media figure, United Kingdom
Kenneth MacKenzie (disambiguation), several people including:
Kenneth Mackenzie, 7th of Kintail (died 1492), chief of the Clan Mackenzie
Kenneth Mackenzie, 10th of Kintail (died 1568), chief of the Clan Mackenzie
Kenneth Mackenzie, 1st Lord Mackenzie of Kintail (died 1611), chief of the Clan Mackenzie
Kenneth Mackenzie, 3rd Earl of Seaforth (1635–1678), chief of the Clan Mackenzie
Kenneth D. Mackenzie (born 1937), business theorist
Kenneth R. Mackenzie (born 1908), civil servant and author/translator
Kenneth Ross MacKenzie (1912–2002), American Physicist and discoverer of astatine
Kenneth R. H. Mackenzie (1833–1886), translator of the German prankster tale Till Eulenspiegel into English (Master Tyll Owlglass: His Marvellous Adventures and Rare Conceits)
Laurence MacKenzie, Scottish footballer
Lewis MacKenzie (born 1940), retired Canadian general and writer
Morell Mackenzie (1837–1892), British physician
Murdo MacKenzie (courtier) (died 1590), Scottish landowner and builder of Fairburn Tower
Murdo MacKenzie (minister) (1835-1912), minister of the Free Church of Scotland
Murdo MacKenzie (1850–1939), Scottish raconteur, Colorado and Brazilian cattle rancher
Neil MacKenzie (born 1976), English football player
Norman MacKenzie (disambiguation), several people
Norman MacKenzie (politician) (1894–1986), Canadian author, lawyer, professor and member of the senate
Norman Mackenzie (conductor), American conductor
Osgood Mackenzie (1842–1922), Scottish gardener and landowner
Peter Samuel George Mackenzie (1862–1914), Canadian politician
Ranald S. Mackenzie (1840–1889), U.S. Army Civil War and Indian Wars officer
Robert MacKenzie (disambiguation), several people
Robert C. MacKenzie (1948–1995), American professional soldier
Robert Ramsay Mackenzie (1811–1873), premier of Queensland, Australia
Robert W. Mackenzie (born 1928), politician in Ontario, Canada
Ruth Mackenzie, British artistic director
Sally MacKenzie, American romance author
Stephen Mackenzie (1844–1909), British medical doctor
Talitha MacKenzie, American ethnomusicologist
Thomas Mackenzie (disambiguation), several people
Thomas MacKenzie (Russian admiral) (1740–1786), Russian rear admiral, founder of the city of Sevastopol in Crimea, Russian Empire
Thomas Mackenzie (1854–1930), prime minister of New Zealand
Walter Mackenzie (1909–1978), Canadian surgeon and academic
Warren MacKenzie (1924–2018), American craft potter
William Lyon Mackenzie (1795–1861), Canadian journalist and rebel
William Lyon Mackenzie King (1874–1950 tenth prime minister of Canada
William Mackenzie (disambiguation), several people

McKenzie
A. Daniel McKenzie (1924–1989), Canadian politician
Albert Edward McKenzie (1898–1918), English Victoria Cross recipient
Archibald McKenzie (born 1841), American politician in New Brunswick
Archibald McKenzie (footballer) (1863–1946), Scottish footballer for Clyde and West Bromwich Albion
Archie McKenzie ( 1900s), Scottish footballer for Partick Thistle
Benjamin McKenzie (born 1978), US actor
Bob McKenzie (broadcaster), Canadian broadcaster
Bret McKenzie (born 1976), New Zealand actor and musician, member of Flight of the Conchords
Charles E. McKenzie (1896–1956), American politician
Dan McKenzie (geophysicist) (born 1942), British professor and geologist
Daniel Duncan McKenzie (1859–1927), Canadian politician
Dave McKenzie (runner) (born 1943), New Zealand long-distance runner
Don McKenzie (footballer, born 1927)
Donald McKenzie (explorer) (1783–1851), Scottish-Canadian explorer and governor of the Red River Settlement
Duke McKenzie (born 1963), English boxing commentator and former professional boxer
Duncan McKenzie, English footballer
Elizabeth McKenzie (disambiguation), several people
Fay McKenzie (1916–2019), American actress
Frank McKenzie, American United States Marine Corps general
Frank McKenzie (footballer), Scottish footballer
George McKenzie (footballer, born 1908), Scottish footballer
Graham Douglas "Garth" McKenzie (born 1941), Australian and Western Australian cricketer
Hector McKenzie, Scottish footballer
Isaiah McKenzie (born 1995), American football player
Jack McKenzie (disambiguation), several people
Jacqueline McKenzie (born 1967), Australian actress
Jacqueline McKenzie (lawyer), British human rights lawyer
James Mckenzie (outlaw) (born c. 1820), Infamous New Zealand outlaw and folk hero of Scottish Gael heritage
James A. McKenzie (Wisconsin politician) (1862–1918), American politician
Jemma McKenzie-Brown (born 1992), British/American actor
John McKenzie (disambiguation), several people
Johnnie McKenzie, rapper, better known as Jay Rock on the music label Strange Music
Julia McKenzie (born 1941), actress (Miss Marple)
Kahlil McKenzie (born 1997), American football player
Kareem McKenzie (born 1979), American professional football player
Ken McKenzie (1923–2003), Canadian newspaper publisher and sports journalist
Kevin McKenzie (disambiguation), several people
Lee McKenzie (disambiguation), several people
Leon McKenzie (born 1978), English footballer
Linsey Dawn McKenzie (born 1978), British model
Lionel W. McKenzie (born 1919), American economist
Luke McKenzie (born 1981), Australian triathlete
Marc McKenzie (born 1985), Scottish footballer
Mary Beth McKenzie (born 1946), painter of contemporary figures
Neil McKenzie (born 1975), South African cricketer
Paul McKenzie (disambiguation), several people
Peter McKenzie (disambiguation), several people
Polly McKenzie, character in The Inbetweeners
Precious McKenzie (born 1936), New Zealand weightlifter, born in South Africa
R. Tait McKenzie (1867–1938), Canadian-born American surgeon and sculptor
Sarah McKenzie, Australian jazz musician
Scott McKenzie (1939–2012), American singer-songwriter
Thomasin McKenzie (born 2000), a New Zealand actress
Toby McKenzie (1953–2013), American businessman and philanthropist. 
Triston McKenzie (born 1997), American baseball player
William McKenzie (disambiguation), several people
William M. McKenzie, called Red McKenzie (1907–1948), American jazz musician
Winston McKenzie (born 1953), British politician and former amateur boxer

Characters
 Barry McKenzie, an early creation of Barry Humphries
 Bob and Doug McKenzie, from Second City Television
 Cindy "Mac" Mackenzie, from Veronica Mars
 James and Nell Mackenzie, from the Canadian novel The Incredible Journey and the 1963 film
 Karen MacKenzie, from Knots Landing
 Robert MacKenzie, from Andrea Newman's book and TV drama MacKenzie
 Lt. Col. Sarah MacKenzie, USMC, from JAG

References

English-language surnames
Surnames of Scottish origin
Anglicised Scottish Gaelic-language surnames
Patronymic surnames
Clan Mackenzie